Anju Panta is a Nepalese ghazals and playback singer.  She sang popular numbers including the title song of Na biers Timilai na Paye Timilai and Ma Timi Bina Marihaalchhu,  of Saput,  in Kismat, and Sustari sustari mannma for Darr. Panta sang for more than 300 films and more than 7000 Nepalese songs in duets and solos.

Albums 
  with (Jagit Singh)
 single: ""
 Collections: ...more than 5 thousand songs (including albums and films)
 Various TV serials and advertisements
 Over 6000 songs

Hindu song controversy 
She was widely criticized on Nepalese social media after news reports on 5 September 2014 claimed that she refused to sing a festival greeting song because Hindu deities were mentioned in the lyrics. Later she denied the allegation saying she had been sick. In 2014 she converted to Christianity from Hinduism.

Awards 
In December 2009, at the 13th Close Up Hits FM Music Award function, she collected most of the titles, including Best Female Vocal Performance and Best Record of the Year for "Nabirse Timilai", her biggest hit to date.

 Gold medal in all Nepal singing Competition organized by Radio Nepal (2054 B.S.)
 Gold medal in Sanatan Dharma Bhajan Competition
 First position in Dharma Sewa Bhajan (2056 B.S.)
 Uttara Badri Samman (2055 B.S.)
 Naba Nari Samman (2069 B.S.)
 Nepal kalakar Samman (2065 B.S.)
 Radio Resunga Samman (2066 B.S.)
 Christian Arts Associations Nepal (CAAN Samman 2070 B.S.)
 Chhinnalata Samman (2066 B.S.)
 Rastriya Bhibhuti Samman (2070 B.S.)
 Mahendra Nagar Samman (2066 B.S.)
 kalakar Samrakshan Manch Samman Patra (2066 B.S.)
 Hits FM music Award for the best vocal collaboration in 2009-2009-2010-2013 (duet) B.S.
 Image FM Award for the best vocal in (2063 B.S.)
 A grade singer in Radio Nepal
 Naray Gopal Award (2069 B.S.)
 Best Female Award from kantipuf FM (2064-2065-2066 B.S.)
 NEFTA KTV film Award (2066 B.S.)
 Best Female vocal Award From Image FM (2065-2066 B.S.)
 Excellence Play Back Singer Award Nepal Film development Board (2065-2066 B.S.)
 Award From Kantipur TV (2065-2066 B.S.)
 Award From Kalika FM (2066-2067 B.S.)
 Cine award (2066 B.S.)
 Annapurna FM Award (2064-2065-2066 B.S.)
 Box Office Film Award (2067 B.S.)
 Music Nepal popularity Award (2069 B.S.)
 Bindabasini Award (2067 B.S.)

References

External links 

 

Living people
21st-century Nepalese women singers
Place of birth missing (living people)
Nepalese Christians
Converts to Christianity from Hinduism
People from Tanahun District
Nepalese playback singers
Dohori singers
Nepalese ghazal singers
Year of birth missing (living people)